Vishwas Nagar Assembly constituency is a Delhi Legislative Assembly constituency, which is situated in Shahdara. Vishwas Nagar, Shahdara is a locality in North East Delhi.

Members of the Legislative Assembly
Key

Election results

2020

2015

2013

2008

2003

1998

1993

References

Assembly constituencies of Delhi
Delhi Legislative Assembly